South Ballina is a locality located in the Northern Rivers Region of New South Wales - bounded by the Richmond River to the north, the Tasman Sea (Pacific Ocean) to the east, and Keith Hall to the south and west. Across the river to the north, is the town of Ballina (from which "South Ballina" derives its name).

Demographics
The median age of persons in South Ballina was 56 years. There were more males than females, with 60.0% of the population male and 40.0% female. The average household size was 1.7 people per household.

References 

Towns in New South Wales
Ballina Shire